Rabbiting (also rabbit hunting and cottontail hunting) is the sport of hunting rabbits. It often involves using ferrets or dogs to track or chase the prey. There are various methods used in capturing the rabbit, including trapping and shooting. Depending on where the hunting occurs, there may be licenses required and other rules in regards to methods being used.

Hunting
Most rabbit hunters try to locate rabbit holes, which are usually found in wooded areas with higher grounds soft enough for the rabbits to burrow in. Hunters without hounds have the following options. A hunter, alone or with a partner, walks through the possible locations of rabbit hiding places, kicking or stomping possible covers to chase the rabbit out. In winter, an advantage is visible rabbit tracks after a fresh snow. Unraveling tracks allows the hunter to locate the hiding place: if no tracks lead out of a suspected location, then the quarry is located. After this, hunters with short-range arms (archers or the ones with small calibre) may scrutinize the location to find the rabbit and shoot it immobile. Alternatively, one may just as well scare the animal out and shoot it while it is on the run.

Ferreting

Ferrets tend to be the primary animal used in rabbiting, due to their ease in moving about burrows. A jill (female ferret) is more typically used in a hunt than a hob (male ferret). This is because the hob is more likely to "lay up" (killing and eating a rabbit in the burrow, resulting in the hob falling asleep) due to it being stronger than the jill. In modern rabbiting, ferrets wear a locator collar, and the hunter uses a device that emits a faster clicking noise the closer it is to the ferret's collar. When the ferret lays up, the hunter uses the device to locate the ferret. They will then begin digging with a spade to remove it and the trapped rabbit. Hunters can also have the ferret chase the rabbit into a net; long nets can be used, but purse nets are more commonly associated with ferreting.

Some hunters now rely on firearms or dogs to take the prey, rather than laying down nets. Three or four hunters with shotguns will attempt to shoot the rabbit as it bolts from the burrow while being chased by the ferret.

Hunting with hounds

When rabbiting, hunting dogs can be useful in a variety of ways; they can be used to track, flush, or retrieve the animal. The use of hounds for hunting can be dated back to ancient Egyptian times. The most common breeds used for rabbit hunting include sight hounds, lurchers, scent hounds, retrievers, spaniels, settlers, and pointers. Hunting of rabbits involving dogs (usually beagle or basset hounds) is called beagling. 
In the United Kingdom, hunters are allowed to use dogs as long as they don't use more than two and they have the landowner's permission.

Spotlighting
Spotlighting or lamping can refer to any form of rabbit hunting performed at night with the aid of powerful hand-held, rifle mounted or vehicle mounted search lights. The light is often used in conjunction with a dog such as a sighthound, (or lurcher) alongside an air rifle, or some other firearm such as a .22LR.17 HMR The rabbit is illuminated by the light and then shot, or a dog will chase and capture it. Most often lurchers are used to catch the prey, the most popular crosses involve greyhounds, border collies and salukis.

Using a vehicle is a very popular method of spotlighting. Pick ups and 4×4 are preferred modes of transport. ATVS are also popular vehicles for rabbiting. They provide rapid acceleration making it easy to chase down rabbits.

Trapping methods

There is a large variety of different traps that are used to capture rabbits and can be divided into categories. A lot of traps are typically used for pest control. When hunting for sport, long netting is the most common method of trapping. Many traps are illegal.

Spring based traps
These traps have a high rate of success and are very easy to set up. The springs inside the trap are triggered by the weight of the rabbit, causing them to shorten and the door to shut behind the animal, leaving it safely enclosed. Homemade traps such as these do not have a great success rate, as the effectiveness depends entirely on the trap's quality. The way the traps operate vary, but ultimately the rabbit's movement is what triggers them to close.

Pit traps
These traps are quite advanced because they are able to capture a large number of rabbits and automatically reset themselves. They are buried into the ground and usually have a type of tunnel that lures the animal to a spring-loaded trap, which will then drop the rabbit into an enclosure once it is triggered by weight.

Long netting
A long net is used (similar to the purse nets used when ferreting) to catch rabbits that have been scared across a field. Long netting was the primary method of catching farmed rabbits in England before they become a major pest. This method is still used today when ferret or shooting isn't an effective method due to hedgerows or large warrens. There are many different types of nets including the trammel, ditch net, and the quick set. It is important to make sure the correct type and length of net is used for the location and that it is set up correctly. Typically, long nets are placed around burrows so that a bolting rabbit (that is, one leaving its burrow) will become ensnared, allowing the hunter to dispatch it. The act of scaring rabbits towards the net is called flushing and is done by using hunting animals, lamps, ropes, or noise.

Historic rabbiting

In medieval times, a hawk or falcon would have been used to catch the rabbit as it exited the warren burrow. For this type of hunt, an albino ferret would typically be used, allowing the bird-of-prey to more easily recognize it. While this hunting style is still occasionally used, especially in the UK where it remains popular (see Falconry), the methods above have almost entirely replaced it.

Also around this time, the popularity of hare coursing sport was growing. Back then, two greyhounds would be released at the same time in pursuit of the rabbit and the one that kills it is declared the winner of the game; people typically placed bets on which dog would be the victor.

In sixteenth-century Britain, hunting rabbits typically involved two hunters either on foot or horseback, a group of hounds, and a horn. The hunter leading the hounds used the horn to encourage them to chase after the rabbit, while the other stayed at the back of the group to motivate any dogs that fell behind. When the rabbit was caught, its death would be marked by a ritual dissection of its body following a blow of the horn. After the actual hunt, the meat would be taken home by the hunters, and the leftovers were given to the dogs as a reward. The rabbit's meat was not highly rated during this time period; huntsman still collected the meat, but the hunt was ultimately a form of entertainment.

Regulations

United Kingdom
In the United Kingdom it is not required for a hunter to have a game license to kill and take rabbits. The hunting season for rabbits runs through the entire year from January 1 to December 31.

On the Isle of Man, a game license is required to shoot rabbits and a dealer's license is required for dealing any type of game; they can be obtained from the Treasury Office. The hunting season also runs throughout the entire year.

In Jersey, no license is required because there is no hunting season for rabbits.

Guernsey's laws require a shotgun or firearm certificate rather than a hunting license.

In most of these places, it is considered an offence to kill any type of game on a Sunday.

United States
In the United States, every person wishing to hunt must have a state hunting license (few states have exceptions to this). Some national wildlife refuges may have separate permits required. Each state has different hunting seasons for rabbits. In Virginia, the season lasts throughout November, December, and January.

References

Hunting by game